"Carry Me" is a song by Norwegian DJ and music producer Kygo, featuring vocals from American singer Julia Michaels. It was released as sixth single from the album Cloud Nine. It was released via digital download on 12 August 2016 by Sony and Ultra. The song was written by Kygo, Michaels and Justin Tranter and produced by Kygo. The song was performed at the 2016 Summer Olympics closing ceremony in the Maracanã Stadium on August 21, 2016.

Background and writing
"Carry Me" was written Kygo, Julia Michaels and Justin Tranter and produced by Kygo.

Recording and composition
"Carry Me" features Julia Michaels' lead vocals and Justin Tranter backing vocals. Miles Walker mixed the track at Silent Sound Studios, Atlanta, Georgia with assistance from Ryan Jumper and John Horesco IV completed the audio mastering.

Musically, "Carry Me" is a three minutes and fifty-three seconds uptempo tropical house song. In terms of music notation, "Carry Me" was composed using  common time in the key of G major, with a moderate tempo of 105 beats per minute. The song follows the chord progression of C-G-D-Em while  Michaels' vocal range spans from the low note B3 to the high note of C5, giving the song one octave and one note of range.

Music video
Prior to the release of the music video, Kygo debuted a lyric video for the song on August 29, 2016 on Ultra Music YouTube channel. The lyric video, by Luca Brenna for Superbros and Johannes Lovund, was illustrated by Sprankenstein and was animated by Jonathan Folkard. The lyric shows Kygo playing piano and Michaels recording the song on a studio with an orchestra playing strings.

The music video, produced by Savage Isle Productions and Kygo, was released on 5 October 2016 on Kygo's official Vevo channel. The video shows Kygo going out with friends on vacation, and it contains scenes on a yacht, on a footage from a festival and poolside shenanigans.

Credits and personnel
Recording and management
 Mixed at Silent Sound Studios (Atlanta, Georgia)
 Published by Sony/ATV Music Publishing Ltd., Warner Chappell

Personnel

Kygo – songwriting, production
Julia Michaels – vocals, songwriting
Justin Tranter – songwriting, backing vocals
Miles Walker – mixing
Ryan Jumper – assistant
John Horesco IV – mastering 

Credits adapted from Cloud Nine liner notes.

Charts

Weekly charts

Year-end charts

Certifications

Release history

References

2016 singles
2016 songs
Julia Michaels songs
Kygo songs
Song recordings produced by Kygo
Songs written by Kygo
Songs written by Julia Michaels
Songs written by Justin Tranter
Sony Music singles